Eremophila virens, commonly known as green-flowered eremophila or Campion eremophila, is a flowering plant in the figwort family, Scrophulariaceae and is endemic to Western Australia. It is an erect shrub with large, shiny leaves and hairy, yellowish-green flowers.

Description

The petal tube is green to yellowish-green and lacks spots. Both inner and outer surfaces are hairy but the hairs on the inner surface of the tube and its lobes are glandular. The 4 stamens extend beyond the end of the petal tube. Flowering occurs between August and October and is followed by fruit which are dry, woody, oval-shaped to almost spherical,  in diameter with a glabrous covering.

Taxonomy and naming 
The species was first formally described by Charles Gardner in 1942 from a specimen he collected near Campion. The description was published in Journal of the Royal Society of Western Australia. The specific epithet (virens) is a Latin word meaning "becoming green".

Distribution and habitat
Green-flowered eremophila grows in sandy soil on quartzite hills and near granite outcrops in the Mukinbudin - Warralakin area in the Avon Wheatbelt and Coolgardie biogeographic regions.

Conservation
Eremophila virens is classified as "Threatened Flora (Declared Rare Flora — Extant)" by the Department of Environment and Conservation (Western Australia). It is listed as "Endangered" (EN) under the Australian Government Environment Protection and Biodiversity Conservation Act 1999 (EPBC Act) and a recovery plan has been prepared.

Use in horticulture
This is one of the earliest flowering eremophilas, often having blossoms as early as July. Although the flowers are mostly green, they are attractive to nectar-feeding birds. The plant can be propagated from cuttings but these are slow to strike and grafting onto Myoporum rootstock is usually more reliable. It will grow in a wide range of soils in either full sun or part shade, only needs an occasional watering during a long dry spell but can be damaged by heavy frosts. Tip pruning to remove frost-damaged leaves helps to keep the plant compact and sometimes encourages the development of additional flowers.

References

virens
Eudicots of Western Australia
Endemic flora of Western Australia
Plants described in 1942
Taxa named by Charles Gardner